The 1981-82 Fulham RLFC season was the second in the club's history. They competed in the 1981–82 Championship in the Rugby Football League. They also competed in the 1981–82 Challenge Cup and the 1981–82 League Cup. They finished the season in 13th place and were relegated from the top tier of professional rugby league in the UK.

Championship table
Final Standings

Players

References

External links
Rugby League Project

London Broncos seasons
London Broncos season
1981 in rugby league by club
1981 in English rugby league
London Broncos season
1982 in rugby league by club
1982 in English rugby league